Ariosoma major is an eel in the family Congridae (conger/garden eels). It was described by Hirotoshi Asano in 1958, originally as a subspecies of Alloconger shiroanago, which was later moved under the genus Ariosoma. It is a marine, temperate water-dwelling eel which is known from the eastern China Sea, Japan, and Taiwan, in the northwestern Pacific Ocean. It has a widespread distribution, and inhabits sandy regions. Males can reach a maximum total length of 53 centimetres.

The diet of Ariosoma major consists primarily of bony fish and crabs.

References

major
Taxa named by Hirotoshi Asano
Fish described in 1958